Alderete is a surname. Notable people with the surname include:

Bernardo de Alderete (1565–1645), Spanish writer
Jerónimo de Alderete (c. 1518–1556), Spanish conquistador
Jorge Alderete (born 1971), Argentine illustrator 
Juan Alderete (born 1963), Mexican-American musician
Martín Carrillo Alderete (died 1653), Roman Catholic prelate
Megan Alderete (born 1984), American racing cyclist
Reinaldo Alderete (born 1983), Argentine footballer
Terry Alderete (1945–2013), American businesswoman

See also
Alderetes, city in the Cruz Alta Department, Tucumán Province, Argentina

Spanish-language surnames